The following is a list of boards of cooperative educational services (BOCES) in the United States.

State of Colorado

State of New York

Broome-Delaware-Tioga
Capital Region
Cattaraugus-Allegany-Erie-Wyoming
Cayuga-Onondaga
Champlain Valley Educational Services
Delaware-Chenango-Madison-Otsego
Dutchess
Erie 1 
Erie 2 Chautauqua-Cattaraugus
Franklin-Essex-Hamilton
Genesee Valley Educational Partnership
Hamilton-Fulton-Montgomery
Herkimer-Fulton-Hamilton-Otsego
Jefferson-Lewis-Hamilton-Herkimer-Oneida
Madison-Oneida
Monroe #1
Monroe 2 – Orleans
Nassau
Oneida-Herkimer-Madison
Onondaga-Cortland-Madison
Orange-Ulster
Orleans-Niagara
Oswego
Otsego-Delaware-Schoharie-Greene
Putnam-Northern Westchester
Questar III (Rensselaer-Columbia-Greene)
Rockland
St. Lawrence-Lewis
Schuyler-Steuben-Chemung-Tioga-Allegany (Greater Southern Tier)
Eastern Suffolk
Western Suffolk
Sullivan
Tompkins-Seneca-Tioga
Ulster
Washington-Saratoga-Warren-Hamilton-Essex
Wayne-Finger Lakes
Southern Westchester

See also
Board of cooperative educational services (New York)
List of school districts in Colorado
Lists of school districts in New York

References

External links
Joint Management Team (JMT) Regions and Associated BOCES

Public education in New York (state)
Local government in New York (state)